This article features the list of songs recorded by Albanian singer and songwriter Elvana Gjata. For the singer's records on the charts, see Elvana Gjata discography.

Songs

References 

 
Gjata, Elvana